Marcos Aníbal Sánchez Mullins (born 23 December 1989) is a Panamanian footballer who currently plays as a midfielder for Tauro.

Career

Club
Sánchez made his professional debut in 2010 with Panamanian club Tauro. While with Tauro he helped the club capture the Apertura 2010 and Clausura 2012 titles. Overall, Sánchez appeared in 66 matches with Tauro and scored four goals.

After an impressive preseason trial with D.C. United, Sánchez was signed by the American club on a year-long loan on 26 February 2013. However, Sánchez was released on 31 May 2013, and he will return to his old club Tauro. He moved abroad again to join Venezuelan side Deportivo Táchira in December 2013 and he returned to Táchira in summer 2015 after a loan spell at Portuguesa.

International
Sánchez made his debut for the senior squad on 15 January 2011 in a 2011 Copa Centroamericana match against Belize.

International goals
Scores and results list Panama's goal tally first.

References

External links
 

1989 births
Living people
Sportspeople from Panama City
Association football midfielders
Panamanian footballers
Panama international footballers
Tauro F.C. players
D.C. United players
Deportivo Táchira F.C. players
Panamanian expatriate footballers
Expatriate soccer players in the United States
Expatriate footballers in Venezuela
Major League Soccer players
2011 Copa Centroamericana players
2013 Copa Centroamericana players
2013 CONCACAF Gold Cup players
2019 CONCACAF Gold Cup players